The 2022 African Men's Junior Handball Championship was held in Kigali, Rwanda from 20 to 27 August 2022. It also acted as a qualification tournament for the 2023 Men's Junior World Handball Championship.

Egypt won its 13th title after beating Algeria 35–15, while Tunisia captured the bronze medal with a 24–22 win over Angola.

Draw
The draw was held on 22 July 2022 at the head office of the African Handball Confederation in Abidjan, Ivory Coast.

Preliminary round
All times are local (UTC+2).

Group A

Group B

Knockout stage

Bracket

Semifinals

Seventh place game

Fifth place game

Third place game

Final

Final standings

References

Men's Junior Handball Championship
African Men's Junior Handball Championship
African Men's Junior Handball Championship
Sport in Kigali
Junior
African Men's Junior Handball Championship